Palpita flegia, the satin white moth, is a moth in the family Crambidae. It was described by Pieter Cramer in 1777. It is found in Suriname, Colombia, Brazil, Honduras, Nicaragua, Costa Rica, Panama, Mexico, the Caribbean and the United States, where it has been recorded from Alabama, Florida and Texas.

The moth is about 46 mm.

The larvae feed on Thevetia peruviana.

References

Moths described in 1777
Palpita
Moths of North America
Moths of South America